The BL 15-inch Mark I succeeded the BL 13.5-inch Mk V naval gun. It was the first British  gun design and the most widely used and longest lasting of any British designs, and arguably the most successful heavy gun ever developed by the Royal Navy. It was deployed on capital ships from 1915 until 1959 and was a key Royal Navy gun in both World Wars.

Design

Gun
This gun was an enlarged version of the successful BL 13.5-inch Mk V naval gun. It was specifically intended to arm the new s as part of the British response to the new generation of Dreadnought battleships Germany was building, during the naval arms race leading up to World War I. Due to the urgency of the times, the normally slow and cautious prototype and testing stages of a new gun's development were bypassed, and it was ordered straight from the drawing board. Despite its hurried development process, the gun met all expectations and was a competitive battleship main armament throughout both World Wars. According to an American report produced after World War II, the British 15 inch Mk I was the most reliable and accurate battleship main armament of the war, though other guns and mountings had superior individual features.

The barrel was 42 calibres long (i.e., length of bore was 15 in x 42 = 630 in) and was referred to as "15 inch/42". Overall length of gun: 650.4 inches, Weight of gun, excluding breech mechanism: 97 tons 3cwt. Weight of breech mechanism: 2 tons 17cwt. Rifling: polygroove, 76 grooves, uniform right-hand twist of one turn in 30 calibres. Weight of shell: 1,920 lbs (4 AP crh shell), 1,938 lbs (6 crh AP shell – 1937). Weight of charge: 428 lbs cordite, 490 lbs cordite for supercharge. The firing life of a 15-inch gun was approximately 335 full charge firings using standard charges, after which it had to be re-lined.

Mounting
All shipboard mounts of the gun were in twin turrets. Excepting on the battlecruiser , all mountings were designated Mk I, with an as-built maximum elevation of 20°, though some were subject to later modifications. HMS Hood had its guns in a unique mounting, designated Mk II. Incorporating experience from the Battle of Jutland, the Mk II mounting had a maximum elevation of 30°, thus increasing the maximum range. In the 1930s a modification of the Mk I mounting, designated the Mk I (N), was introduced for use in those capital ships that were completely reconstructed. The Mk I (N) mounting also increased the maximum elevation from 20° to 30°. Coastal artillery mountings with higher elevations could reach . The Mk I mounting had a revolving weight of 750 tons (1915) and 785 tons (1935). The Mk I (N) had a revolving weight of 815 tons; the Mk I (N) RP12 mounts of HMS Vanguard had a revolving weight of 855 tons. The Mk II mounts of HMS Hood had a revolving weight of 860 tons.

In service employment

In battle 

In World War II the gun was responsible for the longest range shell-hit ever scored by one battleship on another in combat. In the Attack on Mers-el-Kébir, when the French fleet was largely neutralised following the fall of France to the Germans, the BL 15-inch Mark I gun (arming ,  and HMS ) was responsible for the destruction by a magazine explosion of the old battleship , and the disabling and beaching (deliberate running aground in shallow water) of the old battleship  and the new battleship . Dunkerque'''s main 225mm armour belt was twice penetrated by 15-inch shells, which destroyed its fighting and steaming abilities.

 Warships 

These guns were used on several classes of battleships from 1914 until , the last battleship to be built for the Royal Navy, completed in 1946.

Warships armed with the BL 15-inch Mark I gun:
 s (Five ships with eight guns each – 3 ships converted to Mk I (N))
 s (Five ships with eight guns each)
 s (Two ships with six guns each – 1 ship converted to Mk I (N))
  – battlecruiser (Eight guns, Mk II mounting)
 s (Two ships with four guns each)
 s (Two ships with two guns each)
 s (Two ships with two guns each)
 s (Two ships with two guns each)
  – battleship (Eight guns in mountings taken from Courageous and Glorious converted to Mk I (N), with additional armour, designated: Mk I (N) (RP12). The turret supports were designed to withstand supercharge firings.Vanguard was unique among British battleships in having remote power control (RPC) for her main battery turrets.

 Coastal batteries 
 Two coastal guns ("Clem" and "Jane") were mounted near Wanstone Farm in Kent in the 1940s, and were used extensively for cross-Channel fire throughout the war.
 Five guns were mounted in Singapore at Johore battery and Buona Vista Battery in the 1930s.

 Production 
186 guns were manufactured between 1912 and 1918. They were removed from ships, refurbished, and rotated back into other ships over their lifetime.
 Elswick Ordnance Company, Elswick, Newcastle: 34
 Armstrong Whitworth, Openshaw, Manchester: 12.
 William Beardmore & Company, Parkhead, Glasgow: 37
 Coventry Ordnance Works, Coventry: 19
 Royal Gun Factory, Woolwich: 33
 Vickers, Son and Maxim, Barrow-in-Furness: 49

 World War II ammunition 

 See also 
 List of naval guns

 Weapons of comparable role, performance and era 
 38 cm SK L/45 "Max" – German counterpart
 Cannone navale da 381/40 – Italian counterpart

 References 

 Bibliography 

 
 
 
Jordan, John and Dumas, Robert (2009) French Battleships 1922–1956'', Seaforth Publishing, Barnsley.

External links 

 Information at Naval Weapons website
 The IWM guns
 Images from the Vickers Photographic Archives
 
 Terry Gander, Twentieth century British coast defence guns

 

Coastal artillery
World War I naval weapons of the United Kingdom
World War II naval weapons of the United Kingdom
Naval guns of the United Kingdom
380 mm artillery